HOCC Live in Unity 2006 Concert (2CD + Bonus DVD) is a set of two CDs and one DVD which consists of most songs Denise Ho performed in her Live in Unity 2006 Concert.

See also
 YesAsia

Denise Ho albums
2007 live albums
2007 video albums
Live video albums